Bandırma power station is a gas-fired power station in Balıkesir Province in western Turkey, made up of Bandırma I opened in 2010 and Bandırma II in 2016. It is one of the few gigawatt scale power stations in Turkey. It is owned by EnerjiSA.

References

External links 

 

Natural gas-fired power stations in Turkey
Buildings and structures in Balıkesir Province